The Varieties of Religious Experience: A Study in Human Nature is a book by Harvard University psychologist and philosopher William James. It comprises his edited Gifford Lectures on natural theology, which were delivered at the University of Edinburgh, Scotland between 1901 and 1902. The lectures concerned the psychological study of individual private religious experiences and mysticism, and used a range of examples to identify commonalities in religious experiences across traditions.

Soon after its publication, Varieties entered the Western canon of psychology and philosophy and has remained in print for over a century.

James later developed his philosophy of pragmatism. There are many overlapping ideas in Varieties and his 1907 book Pragmatism.

Historical context

Psychology of religion
In the 1890s, a "new psychology" emerged in European and American universities which coincided with the establishment of many new psychology laboratories and the appointment of faculty in psychology. New psychology's novelty was encapsulated by its distinction from philosophy (philosophy of mind in particular) and theology, and its emphasis on the laboratory-based experimental method. As part of this development, the psychology of religion emerged as a new approach to studying religious experience, with the US being the major centre of research in this field.

The Varieties was first presented in 1901-2 as a set of twenty Gifford lectures at the University of Edinburgh. This was a lecture series instituted by Adam Gifford, Lord Gifford and intended to have a popular and public audience on the subject of natural theology, or scientific approaches to the study of religion. James had originally planned for the second half of his lectures to be a philosophical assessment of religion but ill health meant that he could only write one lecture on the topic, resulting in a work more descriptive that James had initially anticipated.

Themes

Religious experiences
In the Varieties, James explicitly excludes from his study both theology and religious institutions, choosing to limit his study to direct and immediate religious experiences, which he regarded as the more interesting object of study. Churches, theologies, and institutions are important as vehicles for passing on insights gained by religious experience but, in James's view, they live second-hand off the original experience of the founder. A key distinction in James's treatment of religion is between that of healthy-minded religion and religion of the sick soul; the former is a religion of life's goodness, while the latter cannot overcome the radical sense of evil in the world. Although James presents this as a value-neutral distinction between different kinds of religious attitude, he in fact regarded the sick souled religious experience as preferable, and his anonymous source of melancholy experience in lectures VI and VII is in fact autobiographical. James considered healthy mindedness to be America's main contribution to religion, which he saw running from the transcendentalists Ralph Waldo Emerson and Walt Whitman to Mary Baker Eddy's Christian Science. At the extreme, the "healthy minded" see sickness and evil as an illusion. James considered belief in the "mind cure" to be reasonable when compared to medicine as practiced at the beginning of the twentieth century.

James devotes two lectures to mysticism and in the lectures outlines four markers of mystical experience. These are:
Ineffable: the experience is incapable of being described and must be directly experienced to be understood.
Noetic: the experience is understood to be a state of knowledge through which divine truths can be learned.
Transient: the experience is of limited duration.
Passivity: the subject of the experience is passive, unable to control the arrival and departure of the experience.

He believed that religious experiences can have "morbid origins" in brain pathology and can be irrational but nevertheless are largely positive. Unlike the bad ideas that people have under the influence of a high fever, after a religious experience the ideas and insights usually remain and are often valued for the rest of the person's life.

James had relatively little interest in the legitimacy or illegitimacy of religious experiences. Further, despite James' examples being almost exclusively drawn from Christianity, he did not mean to limit his ideas to any single religion. Religious experiences are something that people sometimes have under certain conditions. In James' description, these conditions are likely to be psychological or pharmaceutical rather than cultural.

Pragmatism
Although James did not fully articulate his pragmatic philosophy until the publication of Pragmatism in 1907, the approach to religious belief in the Varieties is influenced by pragmatic philosophy. In his Philosophy and Conclusions lectures, James concludes that religion is overall beneficial to humankind, although acknowledges that this does not establish its truth. While James intended to approach the topic of religious experience from this pragmatist angle, Richard Rorty argues that he ultimately deviated from this methodology in the Varieties. In his lectures on saintliness, the intention is to discover whether the saintly virtues are beneficial for human life: if they are then, according to pragmatism, that supports their claim to truth. However, James ends up concluding that the value of the saintly virtues is dependent on their origin: given that the saintly virtues are only beneficial if there is an afterlife for which they can prepare us, their value depends on whether they are divinely ordained or the result of human psychology. This is no longer a question of value but of empirical fact. Hence, Rorty argues that James ends up abandoning his own pragmatist philosophy due to his ultimate reliance of empirical evidence.

James considers the possibility of "over-beliefs", beliefs which are not strictly justified by reason but which might understandably be held by educated people nonetheless. Philosophy can contribute to shaping these over-beliefs — for example, traditional arguments for the existence of God, including the cosmological, design, and moral arguments, along with the argument from popular consensus. James admits to having his own over-belief, which he does not intend to prove, that there is a greater reality not normally accessible by our normal ways of relating to the world which religious experiences can connect us to.

Reception

The August 1902 New York Times review of the first edition ends with the following:

A July 1963 Time magazine review of an expanded edition published that year ends with quotes about the book from Peirce and Santayana:

In 1986, Nicholas Lash criticised James's Varieties, challenging James's separation of the personal and institutional. Lash argues that religious geniuses such as St. Paul or Jesus, with whom James was particularly interested, did not have their religious experiences in isolation but within and influenced by a social and historical context. Ultimately, Lash argues that this comes from James's failure to overcome Cartesian dualism in his thought: while James believed he had succeeded in surpassing Descartes, he was still tied to a notion of an internal ego, distinct from the body or outside world, which undergoes experiences.

Cultural references
The famous 1932 dystopian novel Brave New World by Aldous Huxley has a passage where Mustapha Mond shows this and other books about religion to John, after the latter has been caught for causing disorder between Delta humans in a hospital.

The book is referenced twice in the 1939 “The Big Book” of Alcoholics Anonymous, which is the basic text for members in Alcoholics Anonymous.

In 2012 the Russian-American composer Gene Pritsker released his chamber opera William James's Varieties of Religious Experience.

The 2015 The Man in the High Castle TV series season 2, episode 2, includes this as a book banned by the Japanese, who occupy the former western United States after World War II. One of the characters studies the book as he tries to understand his brief transport to what, for him, is the alternate reality of the United States having won World War II.

The book also appears in the 2021 The Suicide Squad film, as King Shark reads it upside down.

See also
 Cosmic Consciousness
Fideism
 Mysticism
 Religious experience

References

External links

Internet Archive listings for Varieties of Religious Experience

1902 non-fiction books
Books by William James
English-language books
Epistemology literature
Epistemology of religion
Gifford Lectures
History of mental health in the United Kingdom
Philosophy of psychology
Philosophy of religion literature
Psychology of religion
University of Edinburgh